Charles Sutton may refer to:
 Charles Sutton (1756–1846), British clergyman and botanist
Charles Sutton (actor) (1856–1935), American film actor
 Charles Sutton (cricketer, born 1891) (1891–1962), English cricketer and British Army officer
 Charles Sutton (cricketer, born 1906) (1906–1945), English-Chilean cricketer and Royal Naval Volunteer Reserve officer
 Charles William Sutton (1848–1920), British librarian and author
 Charlie Sutton (1924–2012), Australian rules footballer